Explosions is the seventh studio album by Canadian rock band Three Days Grace. It was released on May 6, 2022 through RCA Records. The album was produced by Howard Benson and by members of the band. It is the third album to feature Matt Walst as lead vocalist.

Background and recording
The band announced their seventh studio album, Explosions, after the release of "So Called Life". They also announced tour dates for the spring that will take place in April and May 2022. In February 2022, the band officially revealed the track list and the cover art for the album.

The group began writing the album in February 2020. According to bassist Brad Walst, the album is about, "That feeling inside, like you're gonna explode." He explained the process of recording the album, "We didn’t see each other for the longest time. We recorded nine or ten songs separately, in different studios, and by ourselves, which we’ve never done before." According to Walst, the album has the heaviest songs they've ever written and reminded him of their debut album, Three Days Grace. Drummer Neil Sanderson talked about what inspired the record with Loudwire, "There is a common thread of theme going through it — the notion of just feeling like you have to self-center yourself in today's world, but then at the same time, you have to hear the opinions of everyone."

Singles
"So Called Life" is the first single released from the album. The song peaked at number one on the Billboard Mainstream Rock chart for four consecutive weeks marking the band's 16th number one on the chart. "Neurotic" was released on February 17, 2022, as a promotional single. The second official single "Lifetime" was released on April 11, 2022. The song was dedicated to the people of Mayfield, Kentucky after an EF4 tornado hit the city in December 2021. The song peaked at number 1 both on active and mainstream rock charts making it the bands 17th number 1 on the charts. The third single, "I Am the Weapon" was released on September 27, 2022.

Critical reception

Explosions has been received with positive reviews. Rock N' Load gave the album a 9/10 rating complimenting Matt Walst's vocals on songs such as "Lifetime" and "A Scar is Born". Timothy Monger of AllMusic remarked, "the album feels like a continuation of the gritty, aggressive rock that has been the group's hallmark since the beginning." To date, the album has sold 44,000 equivalent album units in the US.

Awards and nominations

Track listing
All lyrics written by Three Days Grace and Ted Bruner, all music written by Three Days Grace and Ted Bruner, except when noted.

Personnel
Credits retrieved from album's liner notes.

Three Days Grace
 Matt Walst – lead vocals, rhythm guitar, composer, lyricist, producer
 Barry Stock – lead guitar, composer, lyricist, producer
 Brad Walst – bass guitar, composer, lyricist, producer
 Neil Sanderson – drums, backing vocals, piano, composer, producer, programmer

Additional musicians
 Lukas Rossi – guest vocals , composer, lyricist
 Eicca Toppinen –  rhythm cello 
 Paavo Lötjönen – rhythm/bass cello 
 Perttu Kivilaakso – lead cello 
 Mikko Sirén – drums, percussion 
 Lenny Castro – percussion 
 Matthew Kelly – steel guitar 
 Jet Sanderson – additional vocals 

Additional personnel
 Howard Benson – producer, organ 
 Ted Jensen – mastering (Sterling Sound, Nashville, Tennessee)
 Dan Lancaster – mixing engineer
 Ted Bruner – composer, lyricist, programmer 
 Mike Plotnikoff – recording engineer
 Hatch Inagaki – assistant engineer
 Rhys May – assistant engineer
 Paul DeCarli - editor
 Darren Magierowski – additional production / engineer
 Jill Zimmermann – additional production / engineer
 Jay Wud – programming

Charts

References

Three Days Grace albums
2022 albums
Albums produced by Howard Benson
Hard rock albums